Daniel Sabino Martins (born 8 May 1972) is a retired professional footballer who played as a right back.

Born in Brazil, he spent his entire club career there, featuring in the Campeonato Brasileiro Série A for AA Ponte Preta and Palmeiras. One year after becoming a free agent from the latter, he accepted to be a member, as a naturalized citizen, of the Equatorial Guinea national team, playing for them in early 2006. It was his last football experience in active.

Biography
Martins was born in Vitória, the capital of the Brazilian state of Espírito Santo.

In 2000, he signed with Corinthians. Martins participated in the pilot edition of the FIFA Club World Championship, being champion with his then club.

He then played for several years in the Palmeiras, winning the 2003 Série B title with the squad.

International career
Martins also played for Equatorial Guinea in 2006 and was champion of the CEMAC Cup.

International goals

Titles

Last contract
Palmeiras: 5 January to 31 December 2004

References

1972 births
Living people
People from Vitória, Espírito Santo
Equatoguinean footballers
Equatorial Guinea international footballers
Brazilian footballers
Association football fullbacks
Sport Club Corinthians Paulista players
Campeonato Brasileiro Série A players
Associação Atlética Ponte Preta players
Sociedade Esportiva Palmeiras players
Campeonato Brasileiro Série B players
Desportiva Ferroviária players
Naturalized citizens of Equatorial Guinea
Sportspeople from Espírito Santo